Mahonia leptodonta is a shrub in the family Berberidaceae, first described in 1938. It is endemic to China, found in Sichuan and Yunnan Provinces.

References

leptodonta
Endemic flora of China
Plants described in 1938